Álvaro Rengifo Calderón (5 July 1932 – 13 February 2020) was a Spanish politician who served as Minister of Labour of Spain between 1976 and 1977.

References

1932 births
2020 deaths
Labour ministers of Spain
Politicians from Madrid